A katha (also spelled kattha or cottah; Hindi: कट्ठा kaṭṭhā, Assamese: কঠা kotha, Bengali: কাঠা kaṭha) is a unit of area mostly used for land measure in Eastern India, Nepal, and Bangladesh. After metrication in the mid-20th century by both countries, the unit became officially obsolete. But this unit is still in use in much of Bangladesh, Eastern India and Nepal.  

The measurement of katha varies significantly from place to place.    

In Gorakhpur state 1 katha = 1361 square feet. The length of the area should be 40 ft and the breath should be 34.025 ft and length × breath = 1361 sqft.    

 1 Katha or Cottah (কাঠা) = 720 Sqr. Feet (approx) = 66.8902 Sqr. Meter = 1.65 Decimal (শতাংশ/শতক) approx
 1 Bigha (বিঘা) = 20 Katha (কাঠা) = 14,400 square feet = 1320 square meter (approx)
 1 Acre (একর) = 3.0245 Bigha (বিঘা) approx. = 1600 square yards
 1 Hectare (হেক্টর) = 2.47 Acre (একর) = 7.47494 Bigha (বিঘা) = 100 Ayer (এয়র)

In Nepal, it is equivalent to 338.63 m2 (3,645 ft2).    

In the Indian state of Bihar, one katha may vary from 750 ft2 to 2000 ft2.  Also this can be 32 by 30 feet in length and breadth respectively. 

In South Bihar and Patna, 1 Kattha is generally equal to 1361 ft2. 20 Kathas equals 1 Bigha. One katha is further subdivided in 20 dhur.  One dhur is further subdivided in 20 dhurki.
1 hectare= 2.4712 acre or 4 bighas approx; 1 acre = 1.6 bighas or 32 kathas; 1 bigha = 20 kathas; 1 katha = 20 dhoor; 1 dhoor = 6.25 or 6.5 haath; 1 katha = 4 decimal. In Aurangabad and Gaya, 1 Kattha is generally equal to 1361.25 ft². In Saran district 1 katha is equal to 4 decimal(1 decimal in Bihar equals to 435.56 sq feet.). 

In Assam 1 Katha is generally equal to 2880 ft2.  
 
In West Bengal 1 katha is equal to 720 ft2. 

The origin of the term and measurement unit was during the Pala Empire.

See also
List of customary units of measurement in South Asia
Nepalese customary units of measurement

References

 
 

Units of area
Customary units in India
Obsolete units of measurement